Bravado may refer to:
 The Bravados, a 1958 western film
 Bravado (EP), 2008 debut extended play by Australian electronic band Miami Horror
 Bravado (Kirin J. Callinan album), 2017
 "Bravado" (song), 2013 song by Lorde
 "Bravado", a song by Rush from their 1991 album Roll the Bones
 The Bravado Brothers, American professional wrestling tag team